Bedlinog Rugby Football Club is a rugby union team from the village of Bedlinog, South Wales. The club was formed in its present state in 1971 by a local youth club, which was at the time organised by Welsh international Steve Fenwick. Currently the club consists of three teams; 1st's, development, and youth. The club play in the Welsh Rugby Union Division one east and is a feeder club for the Cardiff Rugby .

Club honours
 1999/00 WRU Division Six East - Champions
 2006/07 WRU Division Four South East - Champions
 2007/08 WRU Division Three South East - Champions
 2008/09 WRU Division Two South East - Runners up
 2015/16 SSE Swalec Plate Champions

References

Welsh rugby union teams
Sport in Merthyr Tydfil County Borough